SPD is the Social Democratic Party of Germany, a political party.

SPD may also refer to:

Science and technology
 Suspended Particle Device, glass or plastic with electrically variable light transmission
 Shimano Pedaling Dynamics, clipless bicycle pedals
 Spectral power distribution, of light
 Surge protection device, for electrical voltages
 Severe plastic deformation
 Symmetric positive definite, in linear algebra
 Short-path distillation
 Spin Physics Detector, a component of the planned NICA particle accelerator near Moscow, Russia

Computing 
 Security Policy Database, rules in an IPsec implementation, for example in a High Assurance Internet Protocol Encryptor
 Serial presence detect, a method to access memory module information
 SharePoint Designer, an interface for designing in Microsoft SharePoint
 Short Payment Descriptor, a compact textual data format (a MIME/file type) for an easy exchange of a payment information, using smart phones or NFC devices; a standard for QR code payments
 SPD (Systems Product Division) bus, an I/O bus used in the IBM 9370 and IBM AS/400 systems.

Medicine
 Schizoid personality disorder, a personality disorder
 Sadistic personality disorder, a personality disorder
 Split personality disorder, an alternative name for dissociative identity disorder, a mental disorder.
 Semantic pragmatic disorder, a pervasive developmental disorder
 Symphysis pubis dysfunction, pelvic joint pain during pregnancy or childbirth
 Sensory processing disorder, a neurological disorder
 Sterile processing department, where surgical instruments are sterilized
 Salmon poisoning disease

Organisations
 Freedom and Direct Democracy, a Czech political party
 Social Democratic Party of Germany, a German political party
 Serbian Movement Dveri (Srpski pokret Dveri), a political party in Serbia
 Nintendo Software Planning & Development
 Salym Petroleum Development, a petroleum company in Russia
 Scuola Politecnica di Design, a Milan-based postgraduate design school
 Small Press Distribution, distributor for literary publishers, Berkeley, California, US
 Shanghai Pudong Development Bank, or SPD Bank, China

Police
 Sacramento Police Department
Sanford Police Department
 Sarasota Police Department
 Seattle Police Department
 Springfield Police Department (disambiguation)

Fiction
 Space Patrol Delta, an organization in Power Rangers: S.P.D.
 Special Police Dekaranger, a police organization in Tokusou Sentai Dekaranger

Other uses
 Saidpur Airport (IATA code), Bangladesh
 Supplementary planning document, in UK local development framework

See also
 Schizotypal personality disorder (STPD)
 SDP (disambiguation)